Brian Hall (1937-2010), was a male athlete who competed for England.

Athletics career
He represented England in the 3,000m Steeplechase and the 1 mile race at the 1962 British Empire and Commonwealth Games in Perth, Western Australia.

He was a member of the Manchester & District Lads Club Harriers and later formed the Winsford Athletic Club.

References

1937 births
2010 deaths
English male middle-distance runners
Athletes (track and field) at the 1962 British Empire and Commonwealth Games
Commonwealth Games competitors for England